Wespus is a genus of armoured harvestmen in the family Phalangodidae. There is at least one described species in Wespus, W. arkansasensis.

References

Further reading

 
 
 
 

Harvestmen
Articles created by Qbugbot